Milkshake! (stylised as milkshake!) is a British children's television programming block on Channel 5 and is currently aimed at children aged 3–7.

History

The block debuted on Channel 5's first full day on air, at 7.30am on 31 March 1997 and is broadcast on weekdays from 06:00 to 09:15 and weekends from 06:00 to 10:00. The block has a number of presenters and features a range of children's programming.

Programmes for older children also aired from 1997–2002 and again from 2007–2016 on spin-off block Shake!, which, in its time, ran on weekends after Milkshake!.

Following Viacom's acquisition of Channel 5 in 2014 the block began airing Nick Jr programmes including Paw Patrol, Blaze and the Monster Machines and Shimmer and Shine.

On 6 July 2017, Channel 5 announced a rebranding of Milkshake! that launched on 24 July, including updated branding, a new studio, and the launch of a YouTube channel that would feature digital content related to the block.

TV channel
In November 2008, Channel 5 had been set to launch a new children's channel based on its pre-school programming block. This was a response to the BBC launching the CBBC channel and CBeebies in 2002 and ITV launching the CITV channel in 2006, but plans to launch a standalone preschool channel were put on hold indefinitely while the broadcaster awaited a buyer.

Milkshake! on 5Star
When Five Life launched in 2006, Milkshake! was shown on the channel between 09:00 and 13:00 each day. By April 2011, the channel had reduced its broadcast hours and the block was replaced by teleshopping. On 21 August 2017, Milkshake! relaunched on 5Star, where it aired from 09:15 to 11:00, before a second removal in 2018.

Programming

Current programming

 The Adventures of Paddington
 Ben and Holly's Little Kingdom
 Brave Bunnies 
 Circle Square
 Cooking with the Gills
 Daisy and Ollie
 Go Green With The Grimwades
 Kangaroo Beach 
 Kid-E-Cats
 Little Princess
 Meet the Experts
 Meet the Hedgehogs
 Milkshake! Monkey
 Milkshake! Summer Fun
 Mimi's World
 Odo
 Oggy Oggy
 Pop Paper City
 Pip and Posy
 Pirata and Capitano
 Show Me How
 Sunny Bunnies
 The World According to Grandpa

Programming from Nickelodeon (U.S.)
 Abby Hatcher (2020–2021)
 Baby Shark's Big Show!
 Blaze and the Monster Machines (2015–2018)
 Blue's Clues and You!
 Bubble Guppies (2013–2016)
 Butterbean's Café (2019-2021)
 Dora and Friends: Into the City! (2015–2016)
 Nella the Princess Knight (2017–2020)
 PAW Patrol
 Santiago of the Seas
 Peppa Pig
 Olivia
 Oswald (2002–2009)
 Rusty Rivets (2017–2019)
 Ryan's Mystery Playdate (2020)
 Shimmer and Shine (2016-2020)
 Sunny Day (2019–2020)
 Top Wing

Other acquired programming
 Fireman Sam
 Milo
 Noddy, Toyland Detective
 Ricky Zoom
 Thomas & Friends
 Thomas & Friends: All Engines Go

Upcoming programming
 Mecha Builders

Former programmes

 The Adventures of Sinbad
 The Adventures of the Bush Patrol
 Angels of Jarm (2007-2017)
 Anytime Tales
 Atlantis High
 Audrey and Friends (2000-2002)
 Aussie Antics
 Batman: The Brave and the Bold
 Beachcomber Bay
 The Beeps (2007–2015)
 The Beginner's Bible
 Beyblade
 Bob the Builder (2015-2021) (now on LittleBe)
 Big School (2007–2013)
 Bird Bath
 Blue Water High
 Boyz and Girlz
 Braceface
 Castle Farm (2010–2014)
 City of Friends
 Collecting Things
 Cowboyz and Cowgirlz
 Dan Dare: Pilot of the Future
 Dappledown Farm (1998-2005)
 The Day Henry Met
 Deepwater Black
 Demolition Dad
 Dig & Dug with Daisy
 Don't Blame the Koalas
 Dragon Booster
 Duel Masters
 Enchanted Tales
 The Enid Blyton Adventure Series
 Eric Carle Stories
 Family!
 Fat Dog Mendoza
 Floogals
 Funky Town
 Funky Valley
 Gadget & the Gadgetinis
 Gerald McBoing-Boing (2005–2016)
 Gigglebug
 Groundling Marsh
 Hana's Helpline
 Havakazoo
 Igam Ogam
 Insect Antics
 James the Cat (1998 series)
 Joshua Jones
 KaBlam!
 Klootz
 Land of the Lost
 Lassie
 Lily's Driftwood Bay (2015–2017)
 The Littl' Bits
 Little Antics
 Little Lodgers (2007-2016)
 Loggerheads
 Looney Tunes
 Luo Bao Bei
 Max Steel 
 MechaNick
 Mega Babies
 The Milky and Shake Show (2008–2011)
 Milkshake! Bop Box (2009–2020)
 Milkshake! Bopping About (2017–?)
 A Milkshake! Christmas
 Milkshake! Festive Fun
 Milkshake! Music Box
 Milkshake! Bop Box Boogie (2020–2021)
 The Milkshake! Show (2007–2016)
 Milkshake! Show Songs
 A Milkshake! Summer
 Mirror, Mirror
 Mist: Sheepdog Tales (2007–2015)
 Monkey Makes
 Mofy
 Mya Go
 Pingu
 The Secret Life of Puppies
 Slugterra
 Snobs
 The Softies
 Shane the Chef
 Stickin' Around
 Strange Dawn
 ThunderCats'''
 TREX The Tribe True Jackson, VP USA High Wanda and the Alien (2014–2018)
 What-a-Mess What Makes Me Happy When I Grow Up Why! Wil Cwac Cwac The Wind in the Willows Wissper Wizards of Waverly Place 
 The Wonder Years Woolamaloo The WotWots (2009–2017)

Programming from Cartoon Network (U.S.)
 The Powerpuff GirlsProgramming from Playhouse Disney (U.S.)
 Bear in the Big Blue House (2000–2007)
 The Book of Pooh (2002–2008)

Other acquired programming
 A House That's Just Like Yours Abby's Flying Fairy School (2010–2015)
 Adventures from the Book of Virtues The Adventures of Bottle Top Bill Alvin and the Chipmunks Animal Antics Animal Express Animal Families Animal Xtremes Babar Bananas in Pyjamas (2012–2017)
 Beast Wars: Transformers Becca's Bunch Chloe's Closet (2012–2017) (now on LittleBe)
 Chiro and Friends (2008–2013)
 Digby Dragon Ebb and Flo Fifi and the Flowertots (2005–2014)
 Franklin (2002–2009)
 Harry and His Bucket Full of Dinosaurs (2005–2014)
 Havakazoo Hi-5 James the Cat Jane and the Dragon Jelly Jamm (2012–2016)
 LazyTown (2013–2016)
 Maple Town Mio Mao (2004–2017)
 Miss Spider's Sunny Patch Friends The Mr. Men Show Mr. Men and Little Miss Muppet Babies Noddy in Toyland (2009–2021))
 Nosey Number Adventures Old Bear Stories Olive the Ostrich Olly the Little White Van (2011–2018)
 PB Bear and Friends Pets! Pip Ahoy! (2014–2018) (now on LittleBe)
 Plonsters Play! Pocoyo (2005–2011)
 Poko Poppy Cat (2017–2018)
 Popular Power Rangers Power Rangers Megaforce Power Rangers Samurai Puffin Rock Roary the Racing Car (2007–2017)
 Rolie Polie Olie (2002–2008)
 Roobarb/Roobarb and Custard Too (2005–2013, 2016)
 Rupert Bear, Follow the Magic... Sailor Sid Sandy and Mr. Flapper The Save-Ums! (2003–2015)
 Say it with Noddy (2005–2009)
 Seaside Antics Secret Life of Toys The Secret of Eel Island The Shoe People The Singing Kettle (2001–2005)
 Singled Out Sister Said Simon (2017–2019) (now on Tiny Pop)
 Super Why! The Trap Door Tickety Toc Tickle, Patch and Friends Tiger, Tiger Titch Toby's Travelling Circus Toot the Tiny Tugboat The Treacle People The World of Peter Rabbit and Friends Zack and QuackProgramming originally produced for and aired on PBS Kids
 Angelina Ballerina: The Next Steps (2011–2017)
 Barney & Friends (2002–2007)
 Bert and Ernie's Great Adventures (2008–2015)
 Elmo's World (2002–2012)
 Franny's Feet (2003–2009)
 George Shrinks (2005-2011)
 Jay Jay the Jet Plane (2002–2009)
 Make Way for Noddy (2002–2016)
 Wimzie's HouseNotable presenters
In-vision continuity presenters have been utilised by Milkshake! since the show began on 31 March 1997. The original presenters were Lucy Alexander and Konnie Huq. Huq was replaced by former Nickelodeon presenter Eddie Mathews when she left the show to join the BBC as a Blue Peter presenter.

List of presenters
Current presenters
The year in brackets denotes when the presenter began presenting Milkshake!  Presenters would often refer to the viewers as "Milkshakers" or in the first few years, "Milkyshakers."
 Amy Thompson (2009–present)
 David Ribi (2017–present)
 Derek Moran (2007–present)
 Jen Pringle (2006–present)
 Kemi Majeks (1999–present)
 Kiera-Nicole Brennan (2017–present)
 Nathan Connor (2017–present)
 Olivia Birchenough (2012–present)
 Sita Thomas (2015–present)
 Helena Smee as Milkshake Monkey (2009–present)

Former presenters
 Anna Williamson (1997–2005) 
 Andrew McEwan (2006–2007)
 Beth Evans (2003–2010)
 Gary Evans (2008–2009)
 Casey-Lee Jolleys (1997–2000)
 Curtis Angus (2014–2017)
 Dave Payne (2007–2009)
 Eddie Mathews (1997–2002)
 Hannah Williams (2006–2009)
 Konnie Huq (1997-2000)
 Lucy Alexander (1997–2000)
 Naomi Wilkinson (2000–2010)

Relief and freelance presenters have also anchored Milkshake!'' continuity links, including presenter Ellie Harrison and deaf presenter Gary Evans. The longest serving presenter is Kemi Majeks, who has presented the block for 23 years.

After Beth Evans & Naomi Wilkinson left in 2010, they did British sign language for the rest up until August 2011, while Beth reappeared one more time for a pre-recorded "Handshake" segment on the Milkshake! website back in 2012.

Guest presenters
Hi-5 (Tim Harding (2002), Nathan Foley (2003), Kathleen de Leon Jones (2006), Kellie Crawford (née Hoggart) (March 2006) and Charli Robinson (2007))
Sadie Wilson (2008)
Harley Bird as Peppa Pig (2009–present)

References

External links

Channel 5 (British TV channel) original programming
1997 British television series debuts
Television programming blocks in Europe
Breakfast television in the United Kingdom
Preschool education television networks